Cahill U.S. Marshal is a 1973 American Western film in Technicolor starring John Wayne as a driven lawman in a black hat. The film was directed by Andrew V. McLaglen and filmed on location in Durango, Mexico. The supporting cast features George Kennedy, Neville Brand, Marie Windsor, Royal Dano, Denver Pyle, Jackie Coogan, Harry Carey Jr., Paul Fix and Hank Worden.

Plot
While J.D. Cahill (John Wayne), a widower and U.S. Marshal, is away from home, his two sons Danny (Gary Grimes) and Billy (Clay O'Brien) aid Abe Fraser (George Kennedy) and his gang to escape from jail and to rob a bank. The town's sheriff is shot and killed during the robbery. Billy hides the stolen money while his brother and the rest of the gang return to locked jail cells as an alibi.

When Cahill returns, he and Danny look for the perpetrators with the help of half-Comanche tracker Lightfoot (Neville Brand). Cahill arrests four suspects and although they are innocent, they are found guilty and scheduled to be hanged. While on the tracks of the kids, Cahill and Lightfoot are ambushed by Brownie (Dan Vadis).

Lightfoot hurts him but is eventually killed. Cahill's sons try to return the gang's share of the money to Fraser, resulting in a showdown between Cahill and his boys on one side and Fraser's gang on the other.

Cast

 John Wayne as U.S. Marshal J.D. Cahill
 George Kennedy as Fraser
 Gary Grimes as Daniel Cahill
 Neville Brand as Lightfoot
 Clay O'Brien as Billy Joe Cahill
 Marie Windsor as Hetty Green
 Morgan Paull as Struther
 Dan Vadis as Brownie 
 Royal Dano as MacDonald
 Scott Walker as Ben
 Denver Pyle as Denver
 Jackie Coogan as Charlie Smith
 Rayford Barnes as Simser
 Dan Kemp as Joe Meehan
 Harry Carey Jr. as Hank
 Walter Barnes as Sheriff Grady
 Paul Fix as Old Man
 Pepper Martin as Casey
 Hank Worden as Albert
 James Nusser as Doctor Jones
 Murray MacLeod as Deputy Sheriff Gordine
 Hunter von Leer as Deputy Sheriff Jim Kane

Production
The film was produced by John Wayne's production company Batjac Productions and shot on location in Durango, Mexico.

Reception
In a 1975 interview with writer Tony Macklin for Film Heritage, Wayne said the film had "a good theme" but "wasn't a well-done picture" because it "needed better writing" and "a little more care in the making."

See also
 List of American films of 1973
 John Wayne filmography

References

External links
 
 
 
 

1973 films
1973 Western (genre) films
Batjac Productions films
Warner Bros. films
American Western (genre) films
American sequel films
Films scored by Elmer Bernstein
Films directed by Andrew McLaglen
Films produced by John Wayne
1970s English-language films
United States Marshals Service in fiction
1970s American films